The Punjab University of Technology Rasul (PUT Rasul) is a public sector university located in Rasul, Mandi Bahauddin, Punjab, Pakistan.

History
The  Punjab University of Technology Rasul was founded in 1873 in Lahore as the School of Surveying. In 1906, it was renamed as the Punjab School of Engineering. In 1912, it was again renamed as the Government School of Engineering and was moved to its current location in Rasul.

In 1962, it was once again renamed as Government Polytechnic Institute. Later the institute was upgraded as Government College of Technology in 1974. In 2018, the Government of the Punjab upgraded the college to a full-fledged university of technology.

Programs
The university offers following bachelor's degree programs:

 BS Civil Engineering Technology
 BS Electrical Engineering Technology
 BS Mechanical Engineering Technology
 BS Software Engineering
 BS Technology Management
The university also offers following diploma programs at its constituent college (Rasul College of Technology):

 Diploma of Associate Engineering (DAE) in Civil Technology
 Diploma of Associate Engineering (DAE) in Electrical Technology
 Diploma of Associate Engineering (DAE) in Computer Information Technology

References

External links
 PUT Rasul official website

Public universities and colleges in Punjab, Pakistan
Universities and colleges in Mandi Bahauddin District
1912 establishments in British India
Engineering universities and colleges in Pakistan